Haneh Hadad (19 April 1919 – 5 October 2020) was an Israeli Arab police officer and politician who served as a member of the Knesset for the Labor Party between 1995 and 1996.

Biography
Born in Jish in April 1919, Hadad received a high school education, before joining the police force. He worked as a detective, and became a Chief Superintendent and assistant to the Minister of Police.

In the 1981 Knesset elections, he headed the Arab Brotherhood List, but it won only 0.4% of the vote and failed to cross the electoral threshold. In 1988 he became a member of the Israeli delegation to the United Nations. He was on the Labor Party list for the 1992 elections, but failed to win a seat. However, he entered the Knesset on 5 July 1995 as a replacement for Avraham Burg, and was made a Deputy Speaker. He lost his seat in the 1996 elections.

References

External links
 

1919 births
2020 deaths
20th-century Israeli civil servants
Arab members of the Knesset
Arab people in Mandatory Palestine
Deputy Speakers of the Knesset
Israeli Arab Christians
Israeli centenarians
Israeli diplomats
Israeli Labor Party politicians
Israeli police officers
Members of the 13th Knesset (1992–1996)
Men centenarians
People from Northern District (Israel)